Mbulo is an island in Western Province, Solomon Islands. Lying in the eastern part of the New Georgia Islands, Mbulo is heavily forested with a volcanic center. The terrain elevation above sea level has been estimated to be about 125 metres, but SRTM data suggests a maximum elevation of about 240 metres.

References

External links
Mbula Island at solomondiveadventures.com
Solomon Islands Google Satellite Map
Mbulo Island at solomonislands.com.sb

Islands of the Solomon Islands
Western Province (Solomon Islands)